The CE&D Subdivision is a railroad line owned by CSX Transportation in the U.S. State of Indiana. The line runs from Perrysville, Indiana, to Evansville, Indiana, for a total of 145.6 miles. At its north end the line continues south from the Woodland Subdivision of the Chicago Division and at its south end the line continues south as the Evansville Terminal Subdivision.

See also
 List of CSX Transportation lines

References

CSX Transportation lines